Bertogna is an Italian surname. Notable people with the surname include:

Arno Bertogna (born 1959), Australian association footballer
Lucio Bertogna (born 1946), Italian footballer

See also
Bertagna

Italian-language surnames